Sowar (also siwar meaning "the one who rides" or "rider", from Persian ) was originally a rank during the Mughal Empire. Later during the British Raj it was the name in Anglo-Indian usage for a horse-soldier belonging to the cavalry troops of the native armies of British India and the feudal states. It is also used more specifically of a mounted orderly, escort or guard. It was also the rank held by ordinary cavalry troopers, equivalent to sepoy in the infantry — this rank has been inherited by the modern armies of India and Pakistan.

History
An image from the Carnatic Wars features a Sowar armed with a Musket.

Sowar has been used as the name of a line of wrist-watches by the Swiss West End Watch Co.

See also
 Shah Mustafa, nicknamed Sher-e-Sowar
 Suvari

References

 

Urdu-language words and phrases
Military of the Mughal Empire
Military ranks of British India
Pakistan Army ranks
Military ranks of the Indian Army

fr:Sepoy